St Michael's Church is a redundant Anglican church in the village of Churchill in Oswaldslow, Worcestershire, England.  It is recorded in the National Heritage List for England as a designated Grade II* listed building, and is under the care of the Churches Conservation Trust.

History

The church dates from the 14th century, and contains fragments of masonry from an earlier church building on the site.  It was restored in 1863, and there was another restoration in 1910.

Architecture

The plan of St Michael's consists of a nave with a south porch, and a chancel. At the west end is a bellcote.  Each wall of the nave contains a single window.

Inside the church, the font dates from the 15th century. The pulpit dates from the 17th century, and the communion rail is in Jacobean style.  The chancel screen and the lectern were moved from Great Malvern Priory at the time of the 1910 restoration. The oldest monument is dated 1688.  There are two bells, one of which dates from the 15th century.

See also
List of churches preserved by the Churches Conservation Trust in the English Midlands

References

Grade II* listed churches in Worcestershire
Church of England church buildings in Worcestershire
14th-century church buildings in England
English Gothic architecture in Worcestershire
Churches preserved by the Churches Conservation Trust